The Altrincham Aces are a semi-professional and amateur ice hockey team of the English National Ice Hockey League, based out of the Altrincham Ice Dome, situated on Oakfield Road in Altrincham, Greater Manchester, England.

The team was initially founded in 1961, the team were based out of the old Altrincham Ice Rink, situated on Devonshire Road in Altrincham, Greater Manchester, England, and played until 2003, when the rink was sold, then demolished to make way for a new housing development.

During the period 1986–1995, the team was known as the Trafford Metros, as the team was in part funded by Trafford council. This name was revived in 2009, but then altered to the Manchester Minotaurs in 2013. Until recently the team was affiliated to the Manchester Phoenix a team playing in the English Premier League.

In the course of the team's existence, they played in a variety of regional and national leagues, in the largely amateur structure of the sport within the UK.

In 2015 the Aces were re-formed and entered the English National Ice Hockey League . The team, alongside Widnes Wild, are affiliated to the Manchester Storm (2015–).

Club roster 2022-23
(*) Denotes a Non-British Trained player (Import)

2021/22 Outgoing

Early years
The Aces were formed not long after the collapse of the old British League, and initially played in regional games. In 1967 they became a member of the newly created Northern League, initially playing in the league's 2nd Division. During their 2nd season in this league they had to withdraw as a number of Scottish teams refused to travel as far south as Altrincham to play games.

The 1970s
The Altrincham Aces first appeared on the British ice hockey scene on 4 February 1961, a large home crowd of 2500 witnessing a 9-5 defeat by the Glasgow Flyers. British ice hockey had just seen the failure of the British League and ice hockey survived in several tournaments or series of challenge matches. The team put together by rink manager, Ken Bailey, in the early years included some of the best players in the country including Canadians Chick Zamick (a Nottingham Panthers legend) and Art Hodgins (the Aces’ first player-coach) (both are now in the British Ice Hockey Hall of Fame) and GB players Terry Matthews (also a Hall of Famer), Dave Lammin, Derek Metcalfe, Ian Forbes, Sam McDonald, Bert Smith, Mike Jordan and Ian Dobson. Devonshire Road staged a home international in 1962, Scotland beating England 8-4. After their first defeat, the Aces went undefeated at home against the country's top teams for two years until they lost 5-4 in overtime to the Brighton Tigers in a Cup final replay. Canadians Bob Bergeron and Bruce Beattie starred in the Aces team of 63-64 after many of the GB internationals returned North as Scottish and NE teams got ready to form the Northern League in 1966. Local businessman, Tom Kelly, was an important team sponsor at this time. Aces hockey became more home grown than in the early years as League hockey slowly re-established itself. Aces had joined Division 2 of the Northern League in 1967 playing games against Scottish and North Eastern opposition and endured what must have been some quite lengthy journeys North in the days before an extensive motorway network but had to pull out in their second year when some of their Scottish opponents declined to travel to Altrincham. Bob Gilbert was a fixture in the Aces net and local players such as Roy Warren, Tim Owen, Maurice Wise and Mike O’Gara were later joined by Canadian Stan Windross and also by Beattie, the latter returning to the team in 1969.

The Aces were founder members of the Southern League formed in 1970. The team management included two men who were to have an involvement (on and off) for twenty years, Graham Nurse and Keith Purvis. Aces finished as runners-up to Sussex Senators in the first year with Tim Owen top scoring. Fred Kuster and others added a Swiss flavour in 1972 before Canadian Jim Franceschini led the Aces to their first League success in 1972-73 (the side also including Joe Greenberg (NM), Warren, Graham Horlock, Owen, Beattie, Windross, John Earlam, Sandy Watt, Dave Lawton and Mick Tapsell). Aces were runners-up in 1973-74 despite the addition of Canadians Leo Franchino and brothers Rick and Ron Drennan. Rick Drennan set Southern League scoring records but despite the Aces being ahead on aggregate in the games against title rivals Streatham Redskins, the Londoners would take the trophy on goal average. The Aces also played the London Lions, a Wembley-based pro team, at Deeside, losing 11-3 with several Lions guesting for the Aces. Altrincham ice hockey went back to being more home based but still relatively successful as runners up places followed in 1975-76, 1976–77 and 1978–79 (Inter City League) with Franceschini and Owen regularly near the top of the League scoring charts. The 76 and 77 titles were both lost in home and away playoff defeats to Streatham after the Aces had won the Midland Division, Streatham triumphed again in 79 after the sides had finished level on points, the Redskins prevailing on results between the sides after a crucial 5-2 home decider victory over the Aces (the teams had previously drawn 4-4 in Altrincham). Thereafter, Inter City League positions were restricted by the likes of Streatham, Southampton and Richmond being able to call on greater resources than the Aces. As the likes of Owen and then Warren retired, young players such as Ged Smith (a debut in 76 aged 15), Pete Broadhurst and Paul Bayliss were coming through. In 1975, Paul O'Sullivan played two matches with the team, before returning active military service.

The 1980s
The Aces were instrumental in the formation of an eight team English National League in 1981-82 although the Aces finished in bottom place (and mid table in the English League South as the ICL was now known) with a team including imports, Tommy Gentile and Alan Potts. Gentile returned in 1982-83 with American defenceman Dave Cicerchia and Canadian winger, Don Boyd (still rated highly by many today). The English League had developed into a British National League with three interlocking groups. Aces won Group C with the highlight probably being the 8-7 away victory over Streatham (then one of the top two teams in the country) with a shorthanded winner coming from Boyd in the closing stages. Aces missed out on a place in the National Playoffs after a controversial away decider in the qualifier against Cleveland Bombers but could still claim fifth place overall. A familiar face from the 60s, Bruce Beattie, made several appearances once his non import status had been confirmed.
Financial constraints meant the Aces had to decline an invitation to join the new ten team Heineken Premier League in 1983-84 and lined up in the eleven team Division One instead. The retirements of netminder Ray Williams and forward Ian Turton had weakened the side and the three new imports would be American netminder, Jeff Johnson, forward Matt Weedon and defenceman Jeff ‘Boom Boom’ Epps. Dave Shepherd played his first full season on the wing. A difficult season wasn't helped by the departure midway through of Ged Smith and Pete Broadhurst to Nottingham Panthers and the Aces eventually finished seventh. Johnson and Epps returned to be joined by Dave Creasey in 1984-85 although Creasey was eventually replaced by Mark Stancampiano as Aces slipped a place to eighth. Despite Johnson's ability, the Aces were at a disadvantage to their rivals who were all able to play an extra foreign forward.

1985-86 saw Jeff Epps in his third season being joined by experienced forwards Jim Gauthier and Brian Sims and netminder John Dunford (ex-Blackpool Seagulls). Aces improved to their best Division 1 placing of fifth out of twelve after home and away victories against Premier League Cleveland in the NU Autumn Cup. Gauthier's speed was to the fore as he destroyed Champions-elect Solihull Barons with a string of converted breakaways in a 12-7 win in the last League match of the season. Finnish visitors Grankulla IFK won a post season friendly 19-5 against an Aces Select side (also Epps’ last game for the Aces, defensive stalwart Horlock having retired earlier in the year). The team changed its name to Trafford Metros (reflecting support from Trafford Council) in December 1986 and had Steve Currie and then Jeff Bruinsma in the defensive role (along with Gauthier and Sims up front) but the release of Bruinsma for disciplinary reasons hit the team in the final weeks of the season and the result was seventh place (out of 16).

Division 1 split into North and South conferences for 1987-88 and the Northern group rapidly became a two horse race between the Metros and Cleveland. New faces were forwards Blair Hiddleston and Ken Robertson, defencemen Don Jamieson and (from Blackpool) George Powell as Roy Warren returned in a coaching/managerial role. Metros reached the Autumn Trophy final against Cardiff Devils but were unable to overturn a 7-5 first leg deficit when winning 5-4 in front of a capacity home crowd (including many from Cardiff). The League title rested on a home game against the Bombers and Metros were always second best losing 6-2.

1988-89 certainly boosted air travel. Jamieson returned for a second season and was joined by forwards Scott Dick and Brian Jokat and a young defenceman, Colin McHaffie from Ayr. Dick was soon replaced by Marc ‘Moose’ Damphousse and Jokat was then injured to be replaced by Michel Couvrette. The two French Canadians then went on a scoring spree for several glorious weeks before Couvrette was released due to attitude problems, Dick returning briefly before Jokat's injury healed. By now, Damphousse was suffering from a groin injury and after rescuing Metros from an embarrassing home defeat to Sunderland with eight goals and three assists, most coming in a memorable final period, Moose too was gone to be replaced by Darren Treloar. Soon after, there was an infamous home game with Telford Tigers. Metros had pulled themselves back into the match at 5-6 before Chuck Taylor started a fight after Jokat had gone in on goal. It seemed that Telford targeted our imports and after Jokat and Treloar as well as McHaffie and Tony Harcourt had departed along with Taylor and lesser Tigers, Telford finished the match (now 3 on 3 with all the penalties) still with three imports and ran out easy 10-6 winners.

Metros had been keen to retain Damphousse and he returned for 1989-90 alongside former Toronto Maple Leaf Fred Perlini and Mike Oliverio. Many say that Moose was never the same player after a fight with Ross Lambert in Humberside and he was released in December (joining Whitley in the Premier) to be replaced by freeskating American defenceman Greg Biskup with Oliverio moving up front. Metros’ position didn't improve and they finished sixth out of nine with the season highlights probably the home defeats of arch rivals Telford. 
Failure of sponsorship deals put the Metros’ future at risk for the new season and Perlini had to be released from his contract. Biskup returned to be joined by fellow American Dan Richards and Finn Ari Pekka Mikkola. The side was greatly weakened by defections to the new local rivals, Blackburn Blackhawks. Metros finished eighth (of 11) falling away after a reasonable start. The most intense game of the year was a ‘friendly’ away 10-6 win against a Blackburn side including Perlini, Jamieson (guesting), Smith, Fleury, Winstanley, Powell and Dunford.

The 1990s
1991-92 got off to a bad start as the original imports didn't live up to their CVs so it was all change after a poor first weekend. High scoring import Rick Fera arrived but reasonable form in the Autumn Trophy disappeared as the team, still weakened by players having moved elsewhere, slumped to eighteen straight League defeats. With no-nonsense defenceman (and King of the Penalty Box) Ali Butorac on defence, the arrival of winger Sylvain Naud brought Metros’ first League win, an 11-10 decision over a Blackburn team including Damphousse. Only two more victories were achieved though and the Metros ended up with only six points from 36 games despite heroics from ex-Whitley goalie Peter Graham. Metros won their three home games in the Relegation Playoffs comfortably but a controversial away defeat in Streatham left them needing something from the final away game in Medway. An 8-4 defeat meant that one of its founder members would no longer be in the British League set up. 
Manager Roy Warren sprang a surprise for the new season in the English League as Ukrainian imports were introduced for the first time into British ice hockey. Sergei Gavrilenko and Igor Urchenko were Metros’ pair and it would be fair to say they took time to get used to the general ‘Canadian’ style of play. Ari Mikkola returned up front for the League season before Warren signed a man who would be many people's nomination for the most skilful player to play for an Altrincham team, Oleg Sinkov, Gavrilenko having been released a few weeks earlier. Sinkov and former Fife Flyers netminder, Colin Downie, made their debuts as Sinkov announced himself with five goals against Blackburn and the Metros only lost two more League games in the season, clinching a playoff place with an 8-1 away victory in the last League game at Blackburn (Sinkov scoring six). The outcome of the promotion playoffs would always be down to the two games against Solihull and after a narrow 11-9 home victory, Metros were very much the underdogs for the away return against Chartrand, Chabot, Pound & Co. We then witnessed what was undoubtedly Metros’ finest hour as they took the Barons apart winning 14-3 (Paul Broadhurst top scoring with four) to secure promotion in style.

The Metros’ Lada sponsorship and a new arena being built in Manchester were symptomatic of a boom time in British ice hockey. Rick Fera returned although another big name signing, Dan Dorion, would only play one official match. Giant Ukrainian defenceman, Oleg Posmetiev, was brought in but then replaced by goal poacher, Claude Dumas. Metros were soon rattling in the goals and Fera, Sinkov and Dumas all scored over 100 in the season (all three were aiming for a League century in the final home game against Dumfries but Sinkov was agonisingly left on 99). The Metros for once missed out on the playoffs to Blackburn who were kept ahead mainly by the late addition of Mikkola to their ranks. In February, visitors Lada Togliatti, the Russian Champions, had defeated a Metros Select side 11-1.

1994-95 saw Sinkov and Urchenko joined by fellow Ukrainian international, Vladimir Kirik, as well as Canadians Frank Morris and Martin Smith. A dispute with Altrincham Ice Rink over the future of the team and its ownership led to the Metros being barred from the rink and having to decamp to Bradford. Smith left in mid season but the team's morale got a big boost from a return to Altrincham in the New Year. Import Troy Kennedy and Scotsmen, David Smith and Jim Pennycook joined up but the dash for the playoffs was dented by Kennedy's late injury and a crucial home decider against Swindon was lost 6-5.

1995-96 saw the arrival of arena hockey in Manchester although the Storm went for fresh management and only Nick Crawley and Alan Hough of the home-grown players stayed for any length of time. In Altrincham, the Aces took to the ice once more with Ari Mikkola, Lee Land (Canadian trained but living in Sale), Pete and Paul Broadhurst, Dave Shepherd, Pete Winstanley and Greg Allen as the mainstays of the team and Paul Bayliss coaching. Ged Smith also rejoined a couple of months into the season. The English League North quickly developed into a two horse race between the Aces and Humberside Jets and the decider in Hull was lost 8-7 after a disastrous first period. Revenge against Humberside came in the playoffs but with the National playoffs only starting in May, a side including only a few regulars was blown away by Wight Raiders in the semis.

1996-97 followed a similar course with the season decider a home game against the renamed Kingston Jets but that was lost 4-3 despite the return to the side of Paul Fleury and Nick Crawley halfway through the season. The conceding of last minute equalizers in away games at Billingham and Kingston also proved costly for the League title in hindsight. Kingston were again overcome in the playoffs but although a stronger side took on Wight, Aces were still well defeated home and away in the National semis.

The next year started off with a farcical 16-1 defeat as the importless Aces found themselves up against a Solihull team with five imports. Mikkola returned from injury halfway through the campaign to be joined by Mark Stokes but the Aces finished fourth as Kingston pipped us to the best of the rest title. One strange game had seen the Aces travel to Sunderland with just seven skaters but stun a reasonable home side 11-2. With a large disparity between the top two teams and the rest of the League, the Aces opted out of the playoffs and welcomed Czech visitors, HC Kladnokavanny who were 10-5 winners of a challenge match. 
In 1998-99, Aces finished second in the League behind a stronger Billingham Eagles team although after two fairly heavy defeats by the Eagles, Aces were never close enough to challenge for the title. The team had been bolstered late on after Simon Mills and Tim Dempsey left Blackburn to return home. The season finished with a disappointing third place in the Northern playoff group after two early close defeats by Billingham. The season's last home game against Flintshire saw Ari Mikkola's retirement after struggling with a knee injury for a couple of years.

The 2000s and the Final Season
Dave Shepherd took over the coaching job from Ari for the new season. After a good start to the season Aces faded to a fourth-place finish suffering from rarely being able to put out a settled side. The playoffs were even more disappointing as two early home defeats finished our chances and Aces failed to qualify for the National playoffs from the Northern group. 
Another change on the coaching side saw Paul Bayliss in charge for 2000-01. Aces finished third in the League behind Billingham and Whitley who both included a couple of imports. This was a year of progress for the Aces with young players such as Jason Hewitt establishing themselves in the squad. Whilst early defeats again meant the League playoffs were unsuccessful, Aces were also in a playoff group for the English Cup. A 6-5 home defeat to Whitley Warriors seemed to have ended our hopes but the Aces travelled to Whitley and silenced the large home crowd with a great 9-7 win that virtually assured us of the Cup. The Cup was duly clinched a few weeks later with a home victory over Birmingham and Altrincham Ice Rink was home to major trophy celebrations for the first time in many years.
2001-02 was a close fight between the Aces and Whitley for League honours with both sides a level above their League rivals. A tense 6-5 home victory with a late winner from Simon Mills put us in pole position for the League title but an away 10-3 loss to Kingston in debatable circumstances handed Whitley the title. The Cup title was relinquished by a poor home performance in the semis against Telford and the season ended in defeat by Basingstoke Buffalo in the National semis as frustration with one particular referee boiled over into a farce at the away game in Basingstoke. Bans resulting from that game would harm the Aces’ start to the new season.

The next season, 2002–03, started with a depleted team losing its first two games but subsequent form would have seen the Aces being able to challenge the Sheffield Scimitars for League honours with fourteen straight wins to finish the League season. As with the previous season, the top two teams had been on a different level in the League. The scene for the season had been reinforced by the news in late 2002 that the ice rink was to be closed and redeveloped - this was to be one last year for long time friends to play together as a team. Greg Allen set new season scoring records for a home Altrincham player in finishing as top League scorer with acknowledged assistance from forward linemates Jason Hewitt and Billy Price (second and third in League scoring). A nailbiting 8-7 away win against Sheffield in the playoffs probably represented the Aces’ most exciting win to date and Aces clinched a place in the National Playoff Finals with a 6-1 victory in a decider over Kingston in the last official match played at the Devonshire Road ice rink. Despite the lack of home ice and regular training, the Aces played Basingstoke Buffalo in the finals and won the first leg 5-4 at Blackburn Ice Arena. The return leg, the next day, left us with a case of ‘what might have been’ as a 5-4 loss in normal time led to sudden death overtime and the title being lost by the narrowest of margins as Buffalo got the vital goal. In some ways, a sad way to end but the Aces went out on a high of having competed to their best, one last time.

The next season, 2002–03, started with a depleted team losing its first two games but subsequent form would have seen the Aces being able to challenge the Sheffield Scimitars for League honours with fourteen straight wins to finish the League season. As with the previous season, the top two teams had been on a different level in the League. The scene for the season had been reinforced by the news in late 2002 that the ice rink was to be closed and redeveloped - this was to be one last year for long time friends to play together as a team. Greg Allen set new season scoring records for a home Altrincham player in finishing as top League scorer with acknowledged assistance from forward linemates Jason Hewitt and Billy Price (second and third in League scoring). A nailbiting 8-7 away win against Sheffield in the playoffs probably represented the Aces’ most exciting win to date and Aces clinched a place in the National Playoff Finals with a 6-1 victory in a decider over Kingston in the last official match played at the Devonshire Road ice rink. Despite the lack of home ice and regular training, the Aces played Basingstoke Buffalo in the finals and won the first leg 5-4 at Blackburn Ice Arena. The return leg, the next day, left us with a case of ‘what might have been’ as a 5-4 loss in normal time led to sudden death overtime and the title being lost by the narrowest of margins as Buffalo got the vital goal. In some ways, a sad way to end but the Aces went out on a high of having competed to their best, one last time.

The Re-Birth
Following the demise of the Manchester Minotaurs the Aces entered the English National Ice Hockey League . with the team finishing a credible fifth in their first season.  The team, alongside Widnes Wild, are affiliated to the Manchester Storm (2015–).

The 2015-16 season started with mixed fortunes for the team who struggled with form and injuries to Thomas Revesz and then Chris Hutchinson broke his collar bone during the 8-5 victory against a resolute Hull side in October and he then struggled to return for the remainder of the season. Then The Gilbert brothers suffered injuries, first Tom and then Mikey, who played through the pain barrier to complete a match with a bruised tail bone and fractured hand. The Imports struggled to attend matches and training due to work commitments or playing for the Trafford Tornados, which left the team short benched but this helped the British players to bond and pull together as a team and by January they were a complete unit, lacking in numbers but playing together and showing pride and determination that had not been seen at the club for years.

In the run in towards to end of the season, the Aces could be proud of the performances they produced and the highlight had to be the Blackburn visit in February where both sides played with 100% effort and with Eagles winning 3-1, Aces stepped up a gear to win 9-5 and 5 different players scoring the goals to emphasize the team effort on the ice.

John Murray stepped up to guest for the Manchester Storm, whilst Jared Dickinson played regularly for both teams showing that the Aces has promise and will grow together and a bright future is in store for hockey in Manchester/ Altrincham.

The 2016-17 season started more relaxed to the previous one, where the introduction of the Manchester Storm made all decisions deferred and last minute. The structure was in place, both teams had their own routines at the rink and thought could be given to the structure of the Aces.

In came UK GB Women's Internationals Sarah Hutchinson from Bradford, CJ Ashton and Sam Bolwell from Kingston Diamonds whilst Mason Howard, the previous season's Player of the Year, led the way for the squad of 2015 to resign once more, although he lasted only a couple of matches before quitting due to commitments of setting up his own Personal training business. Former players Jake Nurse resigned and also in came Pawel Slowik from Blackburn although injury kept him out of the side for a long period.

The season was a competitive one with most sides able to beat each other so skill and tactics became the criteria for gaining an advantage over the opposition. Brilliant goals were scored throughout the year including a one handed effort from Jared Dickinson against Hull and individual efforts from Mikey Gilbert, Thomas Revesz; Pawel Slowik  and Jake Nurse excited the crowds at the Altrincham rink. Declan Ryan produced some stunning saves in the Aces net, but ably backed up by Jorge El Haage and Aran Fox the net was secure allowing for a more attach minded presence on the ice. The season was not about any individuals but a team effort as the guys bonded on and off the ice and they pulled together when it mattered and together they reached the playoffs.

So into the playoffs the Aces went and put up a spirited fight but lost 2-0 to the Widnes Wild who went on to win the playoffs. The season ended with the Aces heads held high as they earned the respect of the fans, their teammates and the opposition.

Notes

Sport in Trafford
Altrincham
Ice hockey teams in England
1961 establishments in England
Ice hockey clubs established in 1961